Albina or The White Goddess is a goddess (possibly Etruscan) associated with the dawn and the founding of Great Britain.

"The White Goddess" 
Robert Graves' essay "The White Goddess" describes Albina as of one of fifty sisters (see Danaïdes) who named Albion. It is thought that the original name for Great Britain, Albion, was inspired by the White Cliffs of Dover, derived from the Latin albus, meaning "white" or "bright".

"Etruscan Roman Remains in Popular Tradition" 
Albina is mentioned in Charles Godfrey Leland's 1892 collection of folklore "Etruscan Roman Remains in Popular Tradition". According to Leland, Albina was an Etruscan goddess of light and ill-fated lovers. The accounts of Albina were obtained by word of mouth from local and often illiterate peasants, some of whom were considered witches or "Strega". Possibly a combination of other deities such as Alpanu and Aurora, Albina is described as a beautiful flying woman (or fairy) and associated with light. The Albina referenced by Leland is likely only loosely related to the figure described in The White Goddess.

References

External links
 
 
 

Etruscan goddesses
Love and lust goddesses
Solar goddesses
Dawn goddesses